Black Milk is an album by Gallon Drunk. It was released in 1999 through Self Distribuzione. The album served as the soundtrack for the Greek film of the same name.

Track listing

Personnel 
Gallon Drunk
Jeremy Cottingham – bass guitar
Terry Edwards – saxophone, trumpet, keyboards on "Hurricane"
James Johnston – vocals, guitar, banjo, bass guitar, keyboards, organ, Moog synthesizer, vibraphone, harmonica
Ian White – drums
Production and additional personnel
Gallon Drunk – engineering, recording
Pauline Michailidis – backing vocals on "Theme from Black Milk", "Every Second of Time" and "At My Side"
Tony Papamichael – engineering, recording

References 

1999 albums
Gallon Drunk albums